Isabel Evelize Wangimba Guialo, nicknamed Belinha (born 8 April 1990) is an Angolan handball player for Fleury Loiret HB and the Angolan national team.

She participated at the 2011 World Women's Handball Championship in Brazil, the 2012 Summer Olympics, the 2013 World Women's Handball Championship and the 2016 Summer Olympics.

In 2017, she was voted best player of the 2017 Angola women's handball league.

Achievements 
Carpathian Trophy:
Winner: 2019

References

External links

 

1990 births
Living people
Angolan female handball players
Handball players at the 2012 Summer Olympics
Handball players at the 2016 Summer Olympics
Handball players from Luanda
Olympic handball players of Angola
African Games gold medalists for Angola
African Games medalists in handball
Expatriate handball players
Competitors at the 2011 All-Africa Games
Competitors at the 2015 African Games
Competitors at the 2019 African Games
Angolan expatriate sportspeople in Hungary
Angolan expatriate sportspeople in Spain
Handball players at the 2020 Summer Olympics